Sōseki is a crater on Mercury.  Its name was adopted by the International Astronomical Union (IAU) in 1985. The crater is named for Japanese novelist Natsume Sōseki.

The crater Plath is south of Sōseki, and it contains hollows.

References

Impact craters on Mercury